The men's single skating competition of the 2010 Winter Olympics was held at the Pacific Coliseum in Vancouver, British Columbia, Canada. The short program was held on February 16, 2010 and the free skating was held on February 18, 2010.

The medals for the competition were presented by Vitali Smirnov, Russian Federation; IOC Member, and the medalists' bouquets were presented by Phyllis Howard, United States; ICU Council Member.

Results

Short program
The men's short program was held on February 16.

 TSS = Total Segment Score; TES = Technical Element Score; PCS = Program Component Score; SS = Skating Skills; TR = Transitions; PE = Performance/Execution; CH = Choreography; IN = Interpretation; Ded = Deduction; StN = Starting Number

Free skating
The men's free skating was held on February 18.

 TSS = Total Segment Score; TES = Technical Element Score; PCS = Program Component Score; SS = Skating Skills; TR = Transitions; PE = Performance/Execution; CH = Choreography; IN = Interpretation; Ded = Deduction; StN = Starting Number

Overall

 SP = Short program; FS = Free skating

Judges and officials
Referee:
 Igor Prokop

Technical Controller:
 Sissy Krick

Technical Specialist:
 Pirjo Uimonen

Assistant Technical Specialist:
 Igor Bich

Judges (SP):
 Coco Shean
 Daniela Cavelli
 Vera Tauchmanova
 Patrick Ibens
 Vladislav Petukov
 Philippe Meriguet
 Aniela Hebel-Szmak
 Jiang Yibing
 Nicolae Bellu
 Alexei Shirshov
 Masako Kubota
 Teri Sedej

Judges (FS):
 Coco Shean
 Vera Tauchmanova
 Philippe Meriguet
 Lenka Bohunicka
 Vladislav Petukov
 Teri Sedej
 Deborah Islam
 Elena Fomina
 Inger Andersson

References

External links
 
 Vancouver 2010: Figure Skating 

Men
Men's events at the 2010 Winter Olympics
2010 in figure skating